James Seah (born 27 August 1990) is a Singaporean actor best known for starring in the television drama .

Career
Seah was a finalist on Star Search in 2010. He starred in the web series Let's Play Love in 2011. He appeared in the 2013 television dramas 96°C Café and Mata Mata. He appeared in The Caregivers in 2014. In 2015, he starred in the historical thriller film 1965 and the television drama The Journey: Our Homeland. He starred in the television drama Tanglin, which aired from 2015 to 2018.

He replaced Shane Pow on the television drama , which aired from 2021 to 2022.

Personal life
Seah is married to influencer Nicole Chang Min.

Filmography

Television
Let's Play Love (2011)
96°C Café (2013)
Marry Me (2013)
Mata Mata (2013)
Against the Tide (2014)
The Caregivers (2014)
Who Killed The Lead (2014)
Tanglin (2015-2018)
The Journey: Our Homeland (2015)
Hero (2016)
When Duty Calls (2017)
Fifty & Fabulous (2018)
C.L.I.F. 5 (2019)
 (2019)
Jalan Jalan (2019)
 (2019)
 (2020)
 (2020)
Justice Boo (2021)
 (2021)
 (2021)
 (2021-2022)
Soul Detective (2022)
 (2022)
 (2022)

Film
1965 (2015)

References

Living people
Singaporean male film actors
Singaporean male television actors
1990 births